Haddenham & Thame Parkway railway station is a station in Buckinghamshire serving the village of Haddenham and town of Thame in the neighbouring county of Oxfordshire, England.

History and general information
The historic Haddenham railway station and Thame railway station were on separate lines which closed in 1963.

The current station was opened on the Chiltern Main Line on 5 October 1987 to serve Haddenham and Thame. The British Rail station was built on the north side of Thame Road, Haddenham, and was originally single platform, with the platform sited on the former down line, long since removed. However, in 1998 as part of "Project Evergreen", Chiltern Railways re-doubled the Princes Risborough – Bicester line and re-modelled the platforms so that from 24 May 1998, there are now two, one on either line. Since then the platforms have also been lengthened and the station building has been expanded to include a coffee shop following the removal of the newsagents.

Renovations
In 2014/15, major renovations took place. A larger ticket hall was built and some platforms were extended. The plans were funded by Chiltern Railways, Network Rail, Buckinghamshire County Council and Sustrans and cost £500,000.

Train services
Trains to Bicester Village, Oxford Parkway and Oxford began in 2015, following completion of the Bicester chord allowing Chiltern line services to run from Marylebone to Oxford. 

The Monday - Friday off-peak service consists of:

2 trains per hour to 
1 train per hour to 
1 train per hour to 

Additional services run in peak hours, and other timetabled services run at weekends.

Bus services

This service operates daily, at a frequency of up to every 20 minutes and is branded as Sapphire, the service is operated by Arriva Shires & Essex.

280 (Oxford station - Oxford - Wheatley - Thame - Haddenham - Aylesbury)

These services operate irregularly and are operated by Z&S International and Red Rose Travel.
111 (Aylesbury - Haddenham - Thame - Long Crendon - Oakley)
112 (Aylesbury - Haddenham - Thame - Waddesdon)
270 (Haddenham - Thame - Oxford)

Accessibility
A wheelchair user wanting to travel on a Sunday in 2021 tweeted that she could not have boarded without the assistance of her travelling companion.

References

External links

Railway stations in Buckinghamshire
DfT Category E stations
Railway stations opened by British Rail
Railway stations in Great Britain opened in 1987
Railway stations served by Chiltern Railways